On 13 March, the 1992 Erzincan earthquake struck eastern Turkey with a moment magnitude of 6.7 and a maximum Mercalli intensity of VIII (Severe). Originating on the North Anatolian Fault, it rocked the country, leaving at least 498 people dead, roughly 2,000 injured, and an unknown amount missing. Total financial losses were between $13.5 million and $750 million (US Dollars).

Geology 

Most of Turkey lies on the Anatolian Plate. Deformation from is accommodated through three main faults: the eastern portion of the Hellenic Trench accommodates convergence between the Aegean Sea Plate and the Anatolian Plate in the south, the North Anatolian Fault in the north, along which this earthquake occurred, accommodates the deformation between the Anatolian Plate and the Eurasian Plate which forces the Anatolian west, and the East Anatolian Fault in the east accommodates the same deformation. The Erzincan basin lies on the intersection of this fault on its northern side.

Earthquake 

At 6.7 on the moment magnitude scale, the earthquake was designated as "strong". While the shaking lasted for seven seconds, the maximum Modified Mercalli intensity was officially VIII, and a station near the epicenter recorded IX shaking. More than 3,000 aftershocks rocked the area afterwards.

Aftermath
The quake left at least 498 killed, 2000 injured, collapsed 150 buildings, and damaged over 8,000 homes. The provision of housing following the earthquake is now listed by the Chamber of Civil Engineers in Turkey as one of Fifty civil engineering feats in Turkey. A temporary group of 10 seismographs were set up in the area to monitor aftershocks.

See also
List of earthquakes in 1992
List of earthquakes in Turkey

References

Further reading

Williams, M.S. & Pomonis, A. & Booth, E.D. & Vaciago, G. & Ring, S. (1992). The Erzincan, Turkey Earthquake of March 1992: A Filed Report by EEFIT.

External links

1992 earthquakes
1992 Erzincan
1992 in Turkey
History of Erzincan Province
March 1992 events in Turkey
1992 disasters in Turkey